Shahid Waheed (born 25 December 1966) is a Pakistani jurist currently serving in Supreme Court of Pakistan as s judge since 11 November 2022 and also has been Justice of the Lahore High Court since 27 March 2012.

Elevation to Supreme Court of Pakistan 
The elevation of Shahid Waheed from the Lahore High Court (ILHC), to the Supreme Court was approved by the Judicial Commission of Pakistan (JCP) on 24 October 2022.

References

1966 births
Living people
Judges of the Lahore High Court
Pakistani judges